was a town located in Adachi District, Fukushima Prefecture, Japan.

On December 1, 2005, Tōwa, along with the towns of Adachi and Iwashiro (all from Adachi District), was merged into the expanded city of Nihonmatsu.

As of 2003, the town had an estimated population of 8,041 and a density of 111.34 persons per km2. The total area was 72.22 km2.

External links
 Nihonmatsu official website 

Dissolved municipalities of Fukushima Prefecture
Nihonmatsu, Fukushima